In toxicology, the lowest published toxic dose (Toxic Dose Low, TDLo) is the lowest dosage per unit of bodyweight (typically stated in milligrams per kilogram) of a substance known to have produced signs of toxicity in a particular animal species.  When quoting a TDLo, the particular species and method of administration (e.g. ingested, inhaled, intravenous) are typically stated.

See also
 Certain safety factor
 Lowest published lethal dose (LDLo)
 Median lethal dose (LD50)

References

Concentration indicators
Toxicology